The London Underground 1992 Stock is a type of rolling stock used on the Central and Waterloo & City lines of the London Underground. A total of 85 eight-car trains were built for the Central line and 5 four-car trains were built for the Waterloo & City line.

Construction 
The 1992 Stock was built by British Rail Engineering Limited (BREL) (under ABB) for the Central line following extensive testing of the three 1986 tube stock prototype trains. Even so, the introduction of this stock was far from trouble-free and there were many technical teething problems that had to be ironed out.

Eighty-five 8-car trains were ordered from BREL, each formed of four two-car units (two units had driving cabs, the others were fitted with shunting controls). Upon entering service in April 1993, the new trains gradually replaced the previous 1962 tube stock, which was completely withdrawn two years later. The trains were manufactured at the Derby Litchurch Lane Works.

The propulsion for the trains was manufactured by a consortium of ABB and Brush Traction, and was one of the first examples of microprocessor-controlled traction featuring a fibre-optic network to connect the different control units. The DC traction motors of LT130 type have separately-excited fields and are controlled via GTO (Gate turn-off) thyristors.

A wheel slide protection (WSP) system had to be retrofitted due to the fleet suffering an epidemic problem of wheel flats. This was largely due to an excessive number of emergency brake applications caused during the ATO/ATP testing phases. 

The 1992 stock's design is reminiscent of the 1986 prototypes. The new 2009 stock trains, built by Bombardier Transport for the Victoria line, are more like the 1992 stock in shape and design than the 1995/1996 stock.

Waterloo & City line sets 

After the initial construction run, an additional ten two-car units were built for British Rail for the Waterloo & City line, which at the time was part of the national railway network. The trains were designated as Class 482 until 1 April 1994, when the operation of the line and the trains were transferred to London Underground and the trains were simply referred to as 1992 Stock. The vehicles are essentially identical to those used on the Central line; the main difference being that trip-cocks are used for protection instead of ATO/ATP.

Transport for London and Metronet closed the Waterloo & City line for five months from April to September 2006 to allow major upgrade work on the tunnels and rolling stock. The line's limited access meant that this was the first time that the units had been brought above ground since their introduction 12 years earlier. The refurbishment of the trains saw them painted in the London Underground white, red and blue livery in place of the Network SouthEast colours used since the stock's introduction.

Operation 
The 1992 Stock features both automatic train operation (ATO) and automatic train protection (ATP) which effectively allow the trains to drive themselves. The ATO is responsible for operating the train whilst the ATP detects electronic codes in the track and feeds them to the cab, displaying the target speed limits. This functionality is configured via a master switch in the driver's cab which can be set to one of three positions: Automatic, Coded Manual and Restricted Manual.

In Automatic mode the ATO and ATP are both fully operational. The driver is only required to open and close the doors and press a pair of "Start" buttons when the train is ready to depart. The driver is then tasked with overseeing the operation of the system and can intervene at any time. The ATO controls the train to the desired target speed, whilst the ATP is ready to apply the emergency brakes if the Maximum Safe Speed is exceeded. However, it is not communications-based train control found on the other lines.

In Coded Manual mode, the ATO is disabled and the driver operates the train manually, however, the ATP is still detecting the codes in the track and restricting the driver's actions. The speedometer on 1992 stock is of the horizontal strip design showing two speeds: the Current Speed in green, indicating the speed at which the train is actually travelling, and the Target Speed indicating the speed at which the train should be travelling. Although the target speed is always active whilst running in Automatic or Coded Manual mode, in the latter mode a change in the target speed is indicated with an upwards or downwards tone depending on whether the target speed is increasing or decreasing. Should the driver exceed the target speed, an alarm sounds and the emergency brakes are automatically applied until the train is below the target speed; the alarm then stops, for example if the target speed is 30 mph and the driver is going at 35 mph the emergency brakes will slow the train down to 29 mph.

The ATO and ATP are both disabled and the driver operates the train entirely by sight and according to the signals. This mode is used when there has been an ATP or signal failure, or in a depot where ATP is not used, e.g. West Ruislip and Hainault depots. On the main line, driving in ATO is the same for a train driver as driving through a section where signals have failed.

Announcer system 
The 1992 Stock was the first of its type on the Underground to have a DVA (Digital Voice Announcer) from new. Until 2003, the DVA was voiced by then BBC journalist and presenter Janet Mayo.

Since 2003, voice artist Emma Clarke has provided recordings for the 1992 Stock DVA. The new announcer system also includes next station announcements, which the original system did not include. By 2009, the announcements changed to address other lines that are possible to interchange in alphabetical order. Clarke continues to voice the line's announcements to this day.

In January 2018, the announcements were again revised for certain stations, to include new lines and connections (such as London Overground, TfL Rail and the construction of  station) that did not exist in 2003.

Chancery Lane derailment
On 25 January 2003 a 1992 Stock train with approximately 500 people on board train derailed as it entered Chancery Lane station on the westbound line. The derailment resulted in one door being ripped off and a number of broken windows. 32 passengers received minor injuries.

The cause of the derailment was determined to be the detachment of the rearmost traction motor on the fifth car, caused by a gearbox failure. The traction motor was then struck by the remainder of the train as it passed over it, causing the following bogies to derail.

The entire 1992 Stock fleet was withdrawn from service the same afternoon, and the Central and Waterloo & City lines were closed for several weeks until modifications were made. This included fitting new traction-motor bolts and secondary brackets to prevent a loose motor from striking the track and causing further damage. The lines re-opened in stages from 14 March 2003.

Refurbishment

Central line units 
From 2011 to 2012, the Central line 1992 Stock units underwent a refresh of both the interior and exterior. Some of the noticeable changes included the addition of the new "Barman" seat moquette, new brighter interior lighting and the installation of new window frames. The front of the driving cabs were also refreshed. This included repairing water ingress and replacing a large number of parts with a much simpler design, saving costs on future work and cleaning up the appearance of the front end. The new-style front end can be easily identified by the new red panelling installed on most units instead of the original grey. The refresh came after nearly twenty years of continuous service on the Central line.

TfL is planning a major refurbishment on the Central line units as part of the Central Line Improvement Programme(CLIP). This includes a complete overhaul of the interior and adding new features such as new wheelchair spaces, PIS (Passenger Information Screens) and CCTV installed throughout the train. The London Underground corporate livery will also be repainted on these units as well as the replacement of the current traction motors. Work started in 2019 and has been shown to be heavily delayed for health and financial reasons. A test train was spotted in March 2022. Interior compenents are known to be working as of 26 April 2022.

Waterloo & City line units 

In 2006, the Waterloo & City line was closed for several months to allow for track and signalling upgrade works. During this period, the 1992 Stock units in use on the line were removed by crane from Waterloo depot and taken by road to Wabtec Rail in Doncaster for refurbishment. External changes included repainting the trains, which were still in Network SouthEast livery, into London Underground's corporate livery. Internally, the handrails were repainted from Central line red to Waterloo & City line turquoise, new seat moquette was fitted and CCTV cameras were installed. Later, the units received the new "Barman" moquette fitted to the Central line units, but not the new lighting, window frames or front end.

Future replacement 

In October 2014, it was announced that the 1992 stock would be replaced by a new semi-articulated model referred to as the New Tube for London (NTfL). This has since slipped to 2025. While a cancellation or deferring was never officially announced, it has been implied that the initial order is now only for replacing the 1973 Stock on the Piccadilly line. TfL still has plans on replacing the 1992 Stock on the Central and Waterloo & City lines as well as the 1972 Stock found on the Bakerloo line with NTfL or a future model, but due to a lack of funding, it has been deferred to an unspecified date further in the future. Should a long-term funding deal with the UK Government be made, this may happen sooner. The refurbishment may have delayed said order.

References

External links 

 1992 Tube Stock specifications (TfL)
 1992 Tube Stock - Squarewheels.org.uk

1992
BREL products
Train-related introductions in 1993
ABB multiple units